Machpelah, also known as Macpelah, McPelah, and the Robert B. Taylor Farm, is a historic home and farm located near Townsville, Vance County, North Carolina. The Edward O. Taylor House was built about 1880, and is a two-story, "T"-shaped, vernacular frame dwelling with Greek Revival, Queen Anne, and Colonial Revival details.  Also on the property are the contributing single-story, timber-frame Greek Revival plantation office building (c. 1850, c. 1900); oil house (c. 1900); well (c. 1900, c. 1950); salting house and dovecote; privy (c. 1900); henhouse (c. 1900); flower pit (c. 1920); 1 1/2-story modest Colonial Revival style guesthouse (1954); five tenant houses (c. 1890, c. 1910, c. 1920); feed house (c. 1900); two stables (c. 1900, c. 1950); corn crib (c. 1900); two cemeteries; and the farm landscape.

It was listed on the National Register of Historic Places in 2007.

References

Farms on the National Register of Historic Places in North Carolina
Greek Revival houses in North Carolina
Queen Anne architecture in North Carolina
Colonial Revival architecture in North Carolina
Houses completed in 1880
Houses in Vance County, North Carolina
National Register of Historic Places in Vance County, North Carolina